Matthew John Lock (born 10 March 1984) is an English footballer who plays as a midfielder for Canvey Island.

Career
Lock began his senior career at Exeter City, after coming through the club's youth academy. On 12 October 2002, Lock made his debut for the club in a 1–1 home draw against Rushden & Diamonds. Lock was released from Exeter at the end of the season, having made three Football League appearances. Following a period coaching in the United States, Lock played for non-league clubs Team Bath, Tiverton Town and Mansgotfield United. At Team Bath, Lock made over 100 appearances.

In 2009, Lock signed for Chelmsford City, making 87 appearances for the club in all competitions over the course of two seasons. In the summer of 2011, Lock joined Gloucester City, playing for the club 39 times. In June 2012, Australian club Bunbury Forum Force signed Lock. During his time at Bunbury Forum Force, Lock also took up the position of manager. During the 2013–14 season, Lock rejoined Chelmsford. The following season, Lock signed for Dover Athletic, making 13 league appearances. In July 2015, Lock signed for Maldon & Tiptree. During his time at the club, Lock made 99 appearances in all competitions before retiring on 3 January 2018.

In March 2019, Lock came out of retirement to sign for Bowers & Pitsea. On 14 June 2019, Coggeshall Town announced the signing of Lock in a player-coach role. In October 2019, Lock signed for Canvey Island in a player-coach capacity.

References

1984 births
Living people
Association football midfielders
English footballers
English football managers
Sportspeople from Barnstaple
Exeter City F.C. players
Team Bath F.C. players
Tiverton Town F.C. players
Mangotsfield United F.C. players
Chelmsford City F.C. players
Gloucester City A.F.C. players
Cirencester Town F.C. players
Dover Athletic F.C. players
Maldon & Tiptree F.C. players
Bowers & Pitsea F.C. players
Coggeshall Town F.C. players
Canvey Island F.C. players
English Football League players
English expatriate footballers
English expatriate football managers
Expatriate soccer players in Australia
Expatriate soccer managers in Australia
Association football coaches